Halsön is an island in the north of the Swedish sector of the Bay of Bothnia, in the Kalix archipelago.

Location

There is a beach on the east of the island, with large dunes.
For visitors there are fireplaces, seating areas and rubbish bins.

References
Citations

Sources

Swedish islands in the Baltic
Islands of Norrbotten County
Kalix